William Shaw Kerr (1873 - 2 February 1960) was an Irish Anglican bishop, the first Bishop of Down and Dromore in the Church of Ireland.

Kerr was born in 1873 and educated at Trinity College, Dublin and ordained in 1897, his first post was a curacy at  Lurgan. He was then Rector of Banbridge, Archdeacon of Dromore and finally (before his ordination to the episcopate) Dean of Belfast. He was elected Bishop of Down and Dromore on 9 December 1944 and consecrated on 25 January 1945. He resigned on 31 July 1955 and died on 2 February 1960.

Works

Notes

1873 births
1960 deaths
20th-century Anglican bishops in Ireland
Alumni of Trinity College Dublin
Archdeacons of Dromore
Bishops of Down and Dromore
Deans of Belfast
20th-century Irish writers
20th-century male writers
Irish religious writers